Chapter & Verse is a 2016 American drama film directed by Jamal Joseph and starring Daniel Beaty, Omari Hardwick, Loretta Devine and Selenis Leyva.  Antoine Fuqua served as an executive producer of the film.

Cast
Daniel Beaty
Loretta Devine
Omari Hardwick
Selenis Leyva
Marc John Jefferies
Khadim Diop
Justin Martin
Muhammad Cunningham
Gary Perez
Bryonn Bain

Release
The film premiered at the Hartford Public Library on June 11, 2016.  It was then released in theaters in New York City, Los Angeles, Chicago and Atlanta in February 2017.

Reception
The film has an 88% rating on Rotten Tomatoes.

Nick Schager of Variety gave the film a positive review and wrote "...despite its familiarity, Chapter & Verse manages to make its material both fresh and authentic."

Frank Scheck of The Hollywood Reporter also gave the film a positive review and wrote "Resonating with an authenticity borne of the experiences of its director/co-screenwriter Jamal Joseph, Chapter & Verse movingly portrays the plight of a recently released ex-con striving to make a new life for himself on the mean streets of Harlem."

References

External links
 
 

American drama films
Hood films
2016 drama films
2010s English-language films
2010s American films